Kattumarakaran is a 1995 Indian Tamil language romantic drama film written and directed by P. Vasu. The film stars Prabhu, newcomer Eva Grover and Sanghavi . The songs was composed by Ilaiyaraaja and background score was composed by Deva. The film was released on 15 January 1995, and failed at the box office.

Plot 

Muthazhagu is a fisherman who works in the catamaran of his boss. One day, he saves Vaidehi, a mysterious girl who had attempted suicide. She refuses to identify herself and he keeps her safe as they slowly fall in love with each other.

It later turns out that she is the daughter of a millionaire and belongs to royalty who had become vexed with all the rules, norms, pomp and richness. Will they get to marry each other is the question resolved in the end.

Cast 

Prabhu as Muthazhagu
Anjali as Vaidehi
Sanghavi
Tej Sapru as Raja Rajamanickam
Anandaraj as Muthazhagu's boss
Srividya as Rajalakshmi
Nizhalgal Ravi as Muthazhagu's brother-in-law
M. N. Nambiar as Vaidehi's grandfather
Mohan V. Ram as Senthilnathan
Kazan Khan as Johnny
Sivachandran as Vijay Raghavan
Senthil
R. S. Shivaji
Thyagu
Vengal Rao as Cattle herder

Production 
Tabu was initially chosen as lead actress during the film's launch however she was later replaced by newcomer Eva Grover.

Soundtrack 
The songs were composed by Ilaiyaraaja, with lyrics written by Vaali.

References

External links 
 

1990s Tamil-language films
1995 films
Films directed by P. Vasu
Films scored by Deva (composer)